Oscar Almada (born 18 October 1943) is a former Uruguayan cyclist. He competed in the 1000m time trial and team pursuit events at the 1964 Summer Olympics.

References

External links

1943 births
Living people
Uruguayan male cyclists
Olympic cyclists of Uruguay
Cyclists at the 1964 Summer Olympics
Place of birth missing (living people)